Get Skintight is the third studio album by the American rock band The Donnas, released in 1999 (See 1999 in music) on Lookout!.

As of 2005 it has sold 58,000 units in United States according to Nielsen SoundScan.

Track listing
All songs written by Brett Anderson, Torry Castellano, Maya Ford and Allison Robertson except as noted.
"Skintight" – 2:36
"Hyperactive" – 2:15
"You Don't Wanna Call" – 4:01
"Hook It Up" – 2:36
"Doin' Donuts" – 1:36
"Searching the Streets" – 2:58
"Party Action" – 2:22
"I Didn't Like You Anyway" – 3:57
"Get Outta My Room" – 2:21
"Well Done" – 2:35
"Get You Alone" – 2:21
"Hot Boxin'" – 2:31
"Too Fast for Love" (Nikki Sixx) – 3:29
"Zero" – 2:28

Personnel
 Donna A. (Brett Anderson) – vocals
 Donna R. (Allison Robertson) – guitar, vocals
 Donna F. (Maya Ford) – bass guitar
 Donna C. (Torry Castellano) – drums, percussion, vocals

Production
Producers: Jeff McDonald, Steve McDonald
Engineer: Robert Shimp
Mixing: The Donnas, Robert Shimp
Mastering: John Golden
Layout design: Chris Appelgren

References

The Donnas albums
1999 albums
Lookout! Records albums